Dubovo may refer to:
Bosnia and Herzegovina
 Dubovo Brdo

Moldova
 Dubău, a commune in Transnistria

Montenegro
 Dubovo, Bijelo Polje

Russia
 Dubovo, Vladimir Oblast

Serbia
 Dubovo (Tutin)
 Dubovo (Žitorađa)

See also
 Dubova (disambiguation)